Alice Te Punga Somerville (Te Āti Awa, Taranaki) is a poet, scholar and 
irredentist. Dr Te Punga Somerville is the author of Once were Pacific: Māori connections to Oceania which provides the first critical analysis of the disconnections and connections between 'Māori' and 'Pacific'. Her research work delves into texts by Māori, Pacific and Indigenous peoples that tell Indigenous stories in order to go beyond the constraints of the limited stories told about them.

Academic career 
Since 2021, Te Punga Somerville is Professor of English and of Critical Indigenous Studies at the University of British Columbia. From 2017 to 2021, Te Punga Somerville was Associate Professor and Associate Dean of Faculty of Māori and Indigenous Studies at University of Waikato. Her previously held academic posts have been Senior Lecturer in the School of English at Victoria University of Wellington (2005–2012), Associate Professor Department of English University of Hawai'i at Manoa (2012–2015) and Senior Lecturer Department of Indigenous Studies at Macquarie University 2015 – 2017.  Te Punga Somerville completed a Master of Arts in English at the University of Auckland. She then completed her PhD in English and American Indian Studies at Cornell University in 2004.

Awards 

 Fulbright Graduate Award recipient to study at Cornell University in Ithaca, NY 
 Recipient of a Marsden Fast Start Grant ($140,000) for 'Once Were Pacific Awarded Best First Book from the Native American & Indigenous Studies Association in 2012, for 'Once Were Pacific S.W. Brooks Fellowship 2016, University of Queensland, Australia
 Recipient of Marsden Research Grant ($642,000) for the project 'Writing the new world: Indigenous texts '1900–1975'
 Shortlisted, Mary and Peter Biggs Award for Poetry for Always Italicise at the 2023 Ockham New Zealand Book Awards

 Publications / works 

 Te Punga Somerville, Alice. Once were Pacific: Māori connections to Oceania. University of Minnesota Press. 2012.

 Te Punga Somerville, Alice. Two Hundred and Fifty Ways to Start an Essay about Captain Cook. Bridget Williams Books. 2020.
 Te Punga Somerville, Alice. Always Italicise: How to write while colonised. Bridget Williams Books. 2022.

 Work appears in 

 Rakuraku M. & Manasiadis V. Tātai Whetū: Seven Māori Women poets in translation'. Seraph Press. 2018.
 Alison J. & Hoskins T. Critical Conversations in Kaupapa Māori. Huia Publishers. 2017.
 Anderson W., Johnson M. & Brookes B. Pacific Futures: Past and Present' . University of Hawai‘i Press. 2018.
 

 Ruru J. & Nikora L. 'Ngā Kete Mātauranga: Māori Scholars at the Research Interface'. Otago University Press. 2021.

References 

Year of birth missing (living people)
Living people
Cornell University alumni
New Zealand poets
Academic staff of the University of British Columbia
Academic staff of the University of Waikato
Academic staff of the Victoria University of Wellington
University of Hawaiʻi faculty
Academic staff of Macquarie University
University of Auckland alumni